The Missouri State Capitol is the home of the Missouri General Assembly and the executive branch of government of the U.S. state of Missouri. Located in Jefferson City at 201 West Capitol Avenue, it is the third capitol to be built in the city. (The previous  two were demolished after they were damaged by fire.) The domed building, designed by the New York City architectural firm of Tracy and Swartwout, was completed in 1917.

The capitol’s dome is the first thing travelers see when approaching Jefferson City from the north. In addition to the state Senate and House of Representatives, the capitol also contains offices of the governor, lieutenant governor, secretary of state, state treasurer, state auditor, and some administrative agencies.

It is individually listed on the National Register of Historic Places and is a contributing property in the Missouri State Capitol Historic District.

Architecture, paintings, and statuary

The capitol exterior

The north facade is embellished by a frieze sculpted by Hermon Atkins MacNeil illustrating the history of Missouri, a theme continued on the south facade by the artist Alexander Stirling Calder. The figures in the pediment over the main entrance were sculpted by Adolph Alexander Weinman.

The capitol interior
The capitol’s first floor, home of the State Museum, is embellished with mural paintings and statuary. A prime attraction is a series of murals painted by Thomas Hart Benton in the House Lounge. The grand staircase is flanked by large heroic bronze statues of Meriwether Lewis and William Clark, and the third-floor rotunda is the site of the Hall of Famous Missourians, a group of bronze busts of prominent Missourians honored for their achievements and contributions to the state.

A whispering gallery high within the dome, and a small viewing platform on the dome's roof beneath the statue of Ceres, are areas normally not open to the public except for school tours and other special tours.

The capitol gardens
The Sciences and The Arts Fountains, each with four representative figures, adorn the south lawn.

Sculptor Karl Bitter’s bronze relief, depicting the signing of the Louisiana Purchase by Livingston, Monroe and Marbois, and Weinman’s Fountain of the Centaurs are features of the north grounds.

Tourism
The capitol is Jefferson City's leading tourist attraction. It is a destination for school groups who arrive by busloads, particularly during General Assembly sessions. Students fill the galleries to watch the Senate and House of Representatives in action.

History of the structure

The present capitol, completed in 1917 and occupied the following year, is the third capitol in Jefferson City and the sixth in Missouri history. The first seat of state government was housed in the Mansion House, located at Third and Vine Streets in St. Louis and the second one was in the Missouri Hotel located at Main and Morgan Streets in St. Charles. St. Charles was designated as the temporary capital of the state in 1821 and remained the seat of government until 1826.

It was decided that the capitol should be located more in the center of the state and specifically that it should be located on the Missouri River within  of the mouth of the Osage. A group was sent out to survey various locations. The present location on top of the bluffs in Jefferson City was chosen because it afforded the best view of the Missouri River of any place which they had seen within the limits prescribed by the Constitution.

It was built for approximately $18,500. It was called the "Governor's House and State Capitol." This building burned in 1837. The site is now occupied by the present-day Missouri Governor's Mansion. It was designed by Stephen Hills and modeled on the first Pennsylvania State Capitol in Harrisburg, Pennsylvania. Hills also designed Academic Hall of the University of Missouri; the six Ionic columns that survived the 1892 fire that destroyed the building are now the campus's landmark columns at the David R. Francis Quadrangle.

The fifth capitol (which was at the current site) was completed in 1840 for approximately $350,000, with some claiming that there were bribes and kickbacks. This building also burned on February 5, 1911 when it was struck by lightning. Missouri Senator William Warner said, "I have no tears to shed over the fact that the building has been destroyed as it was totally inadequate and not in keeping with the requirements of our great state."

The original budget called for a building to be constructed for $3 million (equivalent to $ million in ), with an additional $500,000 allocated for site and furnishings.  This was approved in general election by the public by a three-to-one margin, however, the state miscalculated on revenue projections, and ended up collecting $4,215,000. All of this money was eventually used for the entire project, which is one of the reasons why the sculptures and artwork are of such high caliber. Edwin William Stephens of Columbia served as chair of the Capitol Decoration Committee along with University of Missouri art professor John Pickard.

It was also decided that the architect would be selected from a design competition; names were redacted from the submissions so that there would be no local favoritism. A total of 69 architecture firms submitted for the competition, from which a short list of 11 was chosen. Tracy & Swarthout from New York was ultimately selected.

The building is symmetrical in plan, giving equal symbolic weight to both the House and Senate (though the interiors of the two chambers differ greatly).  The style makes many historical references to the Capitol in Washington, D.C., as well as to Greek and Roman temples; however, the typical column capital is a unique variation on the canonical Corinthian capital, replacing the acanthus leaves with local flora.

The stone for the exterior is a dense marble from Carthage, Missouri. Some of the finer details have eroded after 90 years of freeze/thaw cycles. The state has committed $30 Million to study, restore, and prevent further deterioration. It includes  of floor space.

Rotunda chandelier incident
In November 2006, the  dome chandelier, which had been lowered almost to the floor for maintenance, fell the remaining five feet. The chandelier was damaged by the impact and by the ornamental chains that fell on it.  It was sent to St. Louis for repairs. Nearly a full year later, the chandelier was returned and raised in the capitol.  The upper lights were also restored, after they had been turned off for four decades due to light damage to the mural above.  Created in 1918 by the Guth Lighting Company of St. Louis for a cost of $5,000 , the chandelier cost $500,000 to be restored.

Gallery

See also
List of state and territorial capitols in the United States

Sources
 Hunter, Marie Nau, Missouri and Mississippi: Robert Ingersoll Aitken's Sculpture in Jefferson City, Missouri,  Master's Thesis, University of Missouri-Columbia, 1996
 Kvaran & Lockley A Guide to the Architectural Sculpture of America, unpublished manuscript
 Pickard, John, The Missouri State Capitol: Report of the Capitol Decoration Commission, 1917–1928, Capitol Decoration Committee, Jefferson City Missouri, 1928

References

External links 

Missouri State Capitol Missouri Department of Natural Resources
Missouri State Museum Missouri Department of Natural Resources

Government buildings in Missouri
Government of Missouri
Government buildings completed in 1917
State capitols in the United States
Buildings and structures in Jefferson City, Missouri
Government buildings with domes
Museums in Jefferson City, Missouri
History museums in Missouri
Tourist attractions in Jefferson City, Missouri
Individually listed contributing properties to historic districts on the National Register in Missouri
Government buildings on the National Register of Historic Places in Missouri
National Register of Historic Places in Cole County, Missouri
Allegorical sculptures in the United States
1917 establishments in Missouri